James Dolphin (born 17 June 1983, in Takapuna) is a former New Zealand sprinter who competed internationally at the 2008 Summer Olympics and Commonwealth Games.

At the 2006 Commonwealth Games in Melbourne, Australia Dolphin finished eighth in the 200 metres final. At the 2008 Summer Olympics he finished sixth in his heat of the 200 metres and did not advance to the next round.

Achievements

International competition
2007 World Championships Osaka 200m - Quarterfinalist
2006 Commonwealth Games Melbourne 200m - Finalist
2003 World Championships Paris Quarterfinalist
2002 World Junior Championships Kingston

New Zealand championships
2008 Senior Men 200m
2007 Senior Men 100m (1st=), Senior Men 200m
2006 Senior Men 100m, Senior Men 200m
2005 Senior Men 100m, Senior Men 200m
2003 Junior Men 200m
2002 Senior Men 100m

Personal bests

World ranking
200 m  - 2008: 66th

Personal progression

References

New Zealand male sprinters
Commonwealth Games competitors for New Zealand
Athletes (track and field) at the 2006 Commonwealth Games
Athletes (track and field) at the 2008 Summer Olympics
Olympic athletes of New Zealand
People from Takapuna
Living people
1983 births
Athletes from Auckland